The Bahrain GP2 round is a GP2 Series race that is run on the Bahrain International Circuit track in Sakhir, Bahrain.

Winners

See also
 Bahrain Grand Prix
 Sakhir Formula 2 round

GP2 Series rounds
2005 establishments in Bahrain
2015 disestablishments in Bahrain
GP2